NRC, previously called , is a daily morning newspaper published in the Netherlands by NRC Media. It is generally accepted as a newspaper of record in the Netherlands.

History
 was first published on 1 October 1970 after a merger of the Amsterdam newspaper  (founded 1828 by J.W. van den Biesen) and the Rotterdam  (founded 1844 by Henricus Nijgh). The paper's motto is  – Light (referring to the Age of Enlightenment) and Freedom.

After a dispute with the new owners, Donker had to step down on 26 April 2010 and was replaced by Belgian . In 2019, he was succeeded by René Moerland.

On 7 March 2011, the paper changed its format from broadsheet to tabloid.

In 2015 the NRC Media group was acquired by the Belgian company Mediahuis.

In 2022, when it stopped producing evening editions, the paper shortened its official name to NRC, by which it had already been known colloquially.

NRC Next

Between 2006 and 2021 Mediahuis also published nrc•next, a morning tabloid aimed at young people.

Character
While they consider themselves one of the Dutch national "quality" newspapers next to 

Journalists
Journalists who work or have worked for  include: Henk Hofland, Hans van Mierlo, Marc Chavannes, Geert Mak, Karel van Wolferen, Jérôme Louis Heldring, Joris Luyendijk, Marjon van Royen, Derk Jan Eppink, Adriaan van Dis, Ben Knapen, and Paul Marijnis.

Predecessors

The  was an influential Amsterdam-based liberal daily newspaper published between 1828 and 1970. It was founded in 1828 by J.W. van den Biesen, a stockbroker. The paper aimed at providing news about trade, share holding and banking. Later its coverage was expanded to cover political news.

At the peak of its influence—from the time of the Boer War, when it championed the Boer cause in South Africa, through World War I—it was edited by Charles Boissevain. The paper had a liberal stance.

The  was an influential Rotterdam-based liberal daily newspaper published between 1844 and 1970. It was founded in 1844 by Henricus Nijgh.

References

External links

  

1970 establishments in the Netherlands
Dutch-language newspapers
Mass media in Amsterdam
Daily newspapers published in the Netherlands
Liberal media
Publications established in 1970